Nasr Athlétique de Hussein Dey, known as NA Hussein Dey or NAHD for short, is an Algerian football club based in Hussein Dey, Algiers. The club was founded in 1947 and its colours are red and yellow. Their home stadium, Stade du 20 Août 1955, has a capacity of 10,000 spectators. The club is currently playing in the Algerian Ligue 2.

History
The 15 June 1947 to Leveilley coffee Kaddour (now Maqaria), 180 members met to decide on the merger of three clubs of Hussein Dey:  Nedjma Sports Hussein Dey,  the  Ideal Club Cooler  and  Esperance Sportive de Leveilley  The athletic Nasr Hussein Dey was born.

The Nasria is a club that was blessed at the time by the Sheikh Larbi Tbessi. A club that has been active during the war of liberation, and had its share of suffering, pain and of course, its share of martyrs, who responded to the call for 1956/1957 for stop sports clubs Algerians, the NAHD ceased all activity and did not resume until after the country's independence in 1962. Champion Algiers in 1963, he won his only championship of Algeria in 1967.

In 35 years of presence at the highest level of national football, NAHD is mounted on the podium ten times in the league and won an Algerian Cup in 1979. The team also played a final of the African Cup Winners' Cup the same year.

 The Nasria  is known for its training policy advocated by renowned coaches: Fez René Vernier  Reynolds Ammar Boudissa and Jean Snella. This policy was responsible for the emergence of a generation of exceptional players who formed the backbone of the Algerian team in the Spanish World in 1982.

Among the iconic players of the club we quote Defnoun Abdelkader Ouchen Bouyahi  Youcef Khedis Merzekane Fergani El Hocine Aït Lazazi Alliche.

Special mention to Madjer who had the chance to play abroad and that made a world career with the FC Porto especially.
Not to mention Mahmoud Guendouz which is the Algerian player who has the most significant playing time in final phase of World Cup (540 min).
The season 2008, the NAHD became the first Algerian club to move a player to a club in Europe: center-back Rafik Halliche in this case, recruited by Benfica. Halliche will break the record Guendouz by playing seven matches (700 minutes) of the team of Algeria in the last two editions of the World Cup (2010 and 2014).

Nahdiste The school has trained a galaxy of talented players such as Zarabi Guenoun Bouchefra and many others.
But the club's training policy also has perverse effects. Every year, the club does not have a large budget, is bled of its best features. The last three years, we could consider that the workforce is redesigned each "transfer window" or each semester.

Finally we will finish by quoting the presidents that marked the club's history: Benyoucef Bensiam Slimane Hoffman.

Crest

Honours

Domestic competitions
Algerian Ligue Professionnelle 1
Champion (1): 1966–67
Runner-up (5): 1963–64, 1972–73, 1975–76, 1981–82, 1992–93

Algerian Cup
Winner (1): 1978–79
Runner-up (4): 1967–68, 1976–77, 1981–82, 2015–16

Performance in CAF competitions
CAF Confederation Cup: 2 appearances
2006 – Intermediate Round
2018–19 – Group Stage

African Cup Winners' Cup: 3 appearances
1978 – Finalist
1980 – Semi-finals
1994 – Second Round

Players

Current squad

Personnel

Current technical staff

Notable players
Below are the notable former players who have represented NA Hussein Dey in league and international competition since the club's foundation in 1947. To appear in the section below, a player must have played in at least 100 official matches for the club or represented the national team for which the player is eligible during his stint with NA Hussein Dey or following his departure.

For a complete list of NA Hussein Dey players, see :Category:NA Hussein Dey players

Algeria
  Rezki Amrouche
  Yacine Bentalaa
  Billel Dziri
  Farès Fellahi
  Ali Fergani
  Mahmoud Guendouz
  Rafik Halliche
  Meziane Ighil
  Sid Ahmed Khedis

Algeria
  Abdelkader Laïfaoui
  Rabah Madjer
  Chaabane Merzekane
  Fawzi Moussouni
  Lahcène Nazef
  Moncef Ouichaoui
  Mohamed Ousserir
  Abderraouf Zarabi

Africa
  Bhaudry Massouanga
  Paul Emile Biyaga
  Amadou Diamouténé
  Jimmy Bulus

Players in international competitions

African Cup Players
  
 
 
1968 African Cup
  Lakhdar Bouyahi
 
1980 African Cup
  Chaabane Merzekane
  Mahmoud Guendouz
  Mohamed Khedis
  Rabah Madjer

1982 African Cup
  Abdelkader Horr
  Meziane Ighil
  Chaabane Merzekane
  Ahmed Aït El-Hocine
  Rabah Madjer

1984 African Cup
  Mahmoud Guendouz

1986 African Cup
  Chaabane Merzekane

World Cup Players

 
World Cup 1982
  Mahmoud Guendouz
  Mustafa Kouici
  Chaabane Merzekane
  Rabah Madjer
  Yacine Bentalaa

Olympic Players

 
1980 Summer Olympics
  Mahmoud Guendouz
  Chaabane Merzekane
  Mohamed Khedis
  Rabah Madjer
 
2016 Summer Olympics
  Sofiane Bendebka

References

External links

 
Football clubs in Algeria
Association football clubs established in 1947
Football clubs in Algiers
Algerian Ligue Professionnelle 1 clubs
Algerian Ligue 2 clubs
1947 establishments in Algeria
Sports clubs in Algeria